The 22nd Annual GMA Dove Awards were held on April 11, 1991, recognizing accomplishments of musicians for the year 1990. The show was held at the Grand Ole Opry House in Nashville, Tennessee, and was hosted by Clifton Davis and Sandi Patti.

Award recipients

Artists
Artist of the Year
Steven Curtis Chapman
New Artist of the Year
4Him
Male Vocalist of the Year
Steven Curtis Chapman
Female Vocalist of the Year
Sandi Patti
Group of the Year
Petra
Songwriter of the Year
Steven Curtis Chapman

Songs
Song of the Year
"Another Time, Another Place"; Gary Driskell; Word Music (ASCAP)
Rap/Hip Hop Recorded Song of the Year
"It's Time"; Return; The Winans featuring Teddy Riley
Rock Recorded Song of the Year
"Beyond Belief"; Beyond Belief; Petra
Pop/Contemporary Recorded Song of the Year
"Another Time, Another Place"; Another Time...Another Place; Sandi Patti, Wayne Watson
Hard Music Song of the Year
"Stranger"; Holy Soldier; Holy Soldier
Southern Gospel Recorded Song of the Year
"He Is Here"; The Talleys
Inspirational Recorded Song of the Year
"Who Will Be Jesus?"; The Great Exchange; Bruce Carroll
Country Recorded Song of the Year
"Seein' My Father in Me"; Sowin' Love; Paul Overstreet
Traditional Gospel Recorded Song of the Year
"The Potter's House"; Live; Tramaine Hawkins
Contemporary Gospel Recorded Song of the Year
"I L-O-V-E U"; So Much 2 Say; Take 6

Albums
Rap/Hip Hop Album of the Year
Nu Thang; DC Talk
Rock Album of the Year
Beyond Belief; Petra
Pop/Contemporary Album of the Year
Go West Young Man; Michael W. Smith
Hard Music Album of the Year
Holy Soldier; Holy Soldier
Southern Gospel Album of the Year
Climbing Higher & Higher; The Cathedrals
Inspirational Album of the Year
Another Time...Another Place; Sandi Patti
Country Album of the Year
Sojouner's Song; Buddy Greene
Traditional Gospel Album of the Year
Live; Tramaine Hawkins
Contemporary Gospel Album of the Year
So Much 2 Say; Take 6
Instrumental Album of the Year
Come Before Him; Dick Tunney
Praise & Worship Album of the Year
Strong And Mighty Hands; Voices of Praise
Children's Music Album of the Year
Hide 'Em In Your Heart: Bible Memory Melodies, Vol. 1; Steve Green
Musical Album of the Year
Handel's Young Messiah; Various Artists
Choral Collection Album of the Year
I Call You to Praise; Steve Green
Recorded Music Packaging of the Year
Buddy Jackson, Mark Tucker; Beyond Belief; Petra

Videos
Short Form Music Video of the Year
"Revival in the Land"; Carman; Stephen Yake
Long Form Music Video of the Year
Revival in the Land; Carman; Stephen Yake

References

External links
 https://doveawards.com/awards/past-winners/

GMA
1991 in American music
1991 in Tennessee
1991 music awards
GMA Dove Awards